The 2020 Skip's Western Outfitters 175 was the first stock car race of the 2020 ARCA Menards Series East season and the seventh iteration of the event. The race was held on Monday, February 10, 2020, in New Smyrna Beach, Florida at New Smyrna Speedway, a  oval-shaped racetrack. The race took the scheduled 175 laps to complete. At race's end, Sam Mayer of GMS Racing would make a late race charge to the front to win his fifth career ARCA Menards Series East win and his first of the season. To fill out the podium, Derek Griffith of Chad Bryant Racing and Ty Gibbs of Joe Gibbs Racing would finish second and third, respectively.

Background 
New Smyrna Speedway is a 1/2-mile asphalt oval racetrack located near New Smyrna Beach, Florida, that races the NASCAR Advance Auto Parts Weekly Series every Saturday night. It also has a smaller track, known as "Little New Smyrna Speedway" in the infield. This track races quarter midgets on Friday nights.

Entry list

Practice 
The only 100-minute practice session was held on Monday, February 10.

Qualifying 
Qualifying was held on Monday, February 10, at 5:30 PM EST. Each driver would have two laps to set a fastest time; the fastest of the two would count as their official qualifying lap.

Full qualifying results

Race results

References 

2020 ARCA Menards Series East
February 2020 sports events in the United States
2020 in sports in Florida